Fort George is an electoral constituency in the Belize District represented in the House of Representatives of the National Assembly of Belize represented by Henry Usher since 2020. It was previously represented by Usher’s father and former Prime Minister of Belize Said Musa of the People's United Party from 1974 to 1984 and from 1989 until the 2020 general election.

Profile

The Fort George constituency was created for the 1961 general election as part of a major nationwide redistricting. The constituency is based in the easternmost areas of Belize City along the Caribbean Sea, bordered by the Pickstock and Albert constituencies. It is connected to the latter by the Belize City Swing Bridge.

Area Representatives

Elections

References

Political divisions in Belize
Fort George (Belize House constituency)
British Honduras Legislative Assembly constituencies established in 1961
1961 establishments in British Honduras